The Duck River cache is the archaeological collection of 46 Mississippian culture artifacts discovered by a worker on at the Link Farm site in Middle Tennessee in December 1894.

Chert objects

The cache has been called "perhaps the most spectacular single collection of prehistoric Native American art ever discovered in the eastern United States". "Nearly four dozen ceremonial stone knives, daggers, swords, maces, and other striking examples of prehistoric stonework". The ceremonial objects are made from Dover chert, a type of flint found exclusively in the nearby Dover, Tennessee area.

Stone statues
A few months later in March 1895 the same but slightly deeper location was also the site of the discovery of a paired male and female set of Mississippian sandstone statues nicknamed "Adam" and "Eve". The male statue is now at the Metropolitan Museum of Art and the female statue has been lost. The site is preserved as part of the Johnsonville State Historic Park.

See also
 Mississippian copper plates
 Mississippian culture pottery
 Mound Bottom
 Obion Mounds

References

External links
 PBS Antiques Roadshow Appraises Duck River Cache and The Ancestor

Mississippian culture
North American sculpture
American Indian relics